Karen Middleton is an American basketball coach.

On June 21, 2016, she became the 15th head coach of the University of Wisconsin - La Crosse Women's Basketball team.

Prior to her hiring at the University of Wisconsin, La Crosse, she spent one year as an Associate Head Coach at California State University, Fullerton.

On May 15, 2009,  she became the 10th head coach of Western Carolina University Women's Basketball, succeeding Kelly Harper, who was named head coach at NC State University.

Prior to her appointment to Western Carolina, she spent two years as an assistant coach at Illinois.

Player
Middleton attended the University of South Carolina and was a four-year letter winner. She was a team captain, team MVP and a two-time All-Metro Conference selection and finished her career as the fifth-leading scorer in school history with 1,714 points.

Middleton  became the best shooter in USC history and holds school records for career 3FG made (317), career 3FG percentage (44.5), season 3FG made (115) and season 3FG percentage (46.9).  Middleton led her team to four NCAA Tournaments (including a Sweet 16 appearance),and was selected twice as GTE Academic All-District.

Born in Monroe, N.C., she graduated from McBee High School in McBee, S.C., and was the SC player of the year twice (1986 and '87).

South Carolina statistics
Source

Academic

In 1991, Middleton graduated cum laude with a BA, and also earned an Interdisciplinary Master of Arts in Physical Education in 1993, both from South Carolina.

References

External links
 Karen Middleton Bio on Catamountsports.com

Living people
American women's basketball coaches
American women's basketball players
Cal State Fullerton Titans women's basketball coaches
Eastern Washington Eagles women's basketball coaches
Illinois Fighting Illini women's basketball coaches
South Carolina Gamecocks women's basketball coaches
South Carolina Gamecocks women's basketball players
Stanford Cardinal women's basketball coaches
Western Carolina Catamounts women's basketball coaches
Year of birth missing (living people)
Wisconsin–La Crosse Eagles